Bình Lục station is a railway station in Bình Mỹ, Bình Lục, Hà Nam at Km 67 on North–South railway. It serve the district of Bình Lục, Hà Nam.

References 

Railway stations in Vietnam
Hà Nam province